Cryphia nana is a moth of the family Noctuidae first described by William Barnes and James Halliday McDunnough in 1911. It can be found in the US state of California.

External links

Cryphia
Moths described in 1911